Siekierki Power Station is a combined heat and power plant at Augustówka in Warsaw, Poland. It has an installed heat capacity of 2,081 MW and power generation capacity of 622 MW. Construction work on the station started in 1958, and in 1961 the first 50 MW unit went in service. Three further units followed in 1962, increasing its power to 200 MW.

Further units, increasing the power of the station to 600 MW were built between 1974 and 1978.

On April 26, 1976 a turbine disintegrated, whereby one blade shot through the roof and a fire broke out. A further fire occurred on June 2, 2010.

Previously owned by Vattenfall it is now owned by PGNiG.

Technical data 
The power station has five flue gas stacks.

References

Energy infrastructure completed in 1961
Energy infrastructure completed in 1962
Energy infrastructure completed in 1978
Coal-fired power stations in Poland
Cogeneration power stations in Poland
Buildings and structures in Warsaw